Uptown... It's Hot! was a 1986 Broadway play created, directed, choreographed by and starring Maurice Hines. Performed at the Lunt-Fontanne Theatre, the play was a musical anthology chronicling the history of African-American music in the United States.

Although the music garnered praise, the play received generally unfavorable reviews. New York Times critic Frank Rich called it "the theatrical equivalent of a telephone-booth-stuffing contest" and "an orgy of grotesque and sometimes necrophiliac mimicry." The play did, however, earn Hines a Tony Award nomination for Best Performance by a Leading Actor in a Musical.

Uptown... It's Hot! ran from January 28 to February 16, 1986, ending its run after 24 performances.

See also
In the Heights

References

External links
 

Broadway musicals
1986 musicals
Revues